The Advertising Club of New York, also known as The Ad Club and originally called the Sphinx Club, is an advertising industry group promoting self-regulation, professional training and good fellowship. The Advertising Club of New York is the only organization to bring the industry together across all disciplines – marketing, media and agencies – in the name of exchanging ideas and best practices for business and thought leadership. Offering the community access to conversations and key influencers, inspiration and recognition for creativity, the best training for professional development, and a movement for diversity.

Origins 

In 1896, a group of eight advertising men in New York City began meeting for lunch on a regular basis to share ideas on the business that sustained them. They called themselves the Sphinx Club, and in 1906 the growing group incorporated as the Advertising Men's League, ultimately becoming The Advertising Club of New York in 1915.

Most of The Ad Club's early years were spent at the landmark Stanford White building at 23 Park Avenue, where Ad Club members, including the young Bill Paley, J.C. Penney, and Bill Bernbach, conducted business in the main dining room over lunch.

Initiatives 

 1906: First formal course in advertising to be offered by an educational institution at New York University (NYU).
 1911: The first supporter of the "truth in advertising" program, which remains a hallmark of consumer protection and formed the first "Vigilance Committee", which evolved into today's Better Business Bureau.
 1923: Held the first-ever advertising exposition at the 71st Regiment Armory to much acclaim, with an attendance of over 58,000.
 1949: Founded the Advertising Hall of Fame immortalizing 10 giants of our industry the first year, and many more until it was turned over to the American Advertising Federation in 1973.
 1964: Founded the International ANDY Awards to recognize creative excellence in advertising and to raise the standards of craftsmanship in industry.

List of presidents 
2005-Present Gina Grillo, Executive Director
 2003–2005    Renee V. H. Simons, Managing Director, J P Morgan Chase  
 2001 - 2003	Robert Mate, VP/Publishing Director, Meredith Corporation
 1999 - 2001	Carla Loffredo, Sr. Partner/Director, Brand Comm, J. Walter Thompson
 1998 - 1999	Steven Farella, jordanmcgrathcase & partners
 1997 - 1998	Joanne Davis, Bozell Worldwide
 1996 - 1997	R. Jeffrey Petersen, Architectural Digest
 1995 - 1996	Ronald S. Fierman, Warwick Baker O'Neill
 1994 - 1995	Susan C. Russo, The New York Times
 1993 - 1994	Wenda Harris Millard, Family Circle
 1991 - 1993	Wilder D. Baker, Warwick, Baker & Fiore
 1989 - 1991	William F. Marlieb, General Media International
 1987 - 1989	Richard D. O'Connor, Lintas: Campbell-Ewald
 1985 - 1987	Leslie Winthrop, Advertising Agency Register
 1982 - 1985	Judy Guerin de Neco, Judy Guerin, Inc.
 1981 - 1982	Michael Chamberlin, Lebhar-Friedman
 1979 - 1981	Fred R. Messner, Poppe Tyson
 1978 - 1979	Al Ries, Ries, Cappiello, Colwell
 1976 - 1978	Michael Chamberlin, Lebhar-Friedman
 1974 - 1976	Edward Malluk, Timely Linens
 1973 - 1974	Vincent A. Carberry, Precision Valve Corporation
 1971 - 1973	Charles E. Ballard, Winius-Brandon Company
 1969 - 1971	Milton Riback, Milton Riback, Inc.
 1967 - 1969	William T. Leslie, TWA
 1964 - 1967	Walter B. Bruce, American Can
 1963 - 1964	Mervin P. Bickley, United Airlines
 1960 - 1963	Horace H. Nahm, Hooven Letters
 1959 - 1960	Gene Flack, Sunshine Biscuit Co.
 1957 - 1959	Robert M. Gray, Esso Standard Oil
 1955 - 1957	Thomas B. Haire, Haire Publishing
 1953 - 1955	George A. Phillips
 1951 - 1953	George S. McMillan, Bristol-Myers
 1950 - 1951	Frank M. Head, United Cigar-Whelan Stores
 1948 - 1950	Andrew J. Haire, Haire Publishing
 1946 - 1948	Eugene S. Thomas, Bamberger Broadcasting Service
 1944 - 1946	Allan T. Preyer, Vick Chemical Company
 1942 - 1944	John A. Zellers, Remington Rand
 1941 - 1942	I.S. Randall
 1939 - 1941	G. Lynn Sumner, G. Lynn Sumner Co.
 1937 - 1939	Lowell Thomas, television anchor
 1935 - 1937	H.B. LeQuatte, Churchill-Hall Advertising
 1932 - 1935	Grover A. Whalen, John Wanamaker
 1930 - 1932	Charles E. Murphy, Murphy, Block, Sullivan & Sawyer
 1929 - 1930	James Wright Brown, Editor & Publisher
 1927 - 1929	Gilbert T. Hodges, New York Sun
 1925 - 1927	James P. GillroyCharles C. Green, Charles C. Green Advertising Agency
 1923 - 1925	H.H. Charles, H.H. Charles Advertising Service
 1922 - 1923	C. King Woodbridge, The Dictaphone Co.
 1921 - 1922	Frank E. Fehlman, Churchill-Hall Advertising
 1919 - 1921	George W. Hopkins, Columbia Gramophone Co.
 1919 - 1919	F.A. Wilson-Lawrenson, Associated Press
 1917 - 1919	George B. Sharpe, DeLavel Separator Co.
 1914 - 1917	Harry Tipper, Automotive Industries
 1908 - 1914	William H. Ingersoll, Robert Ingersoll & Bros.
 1907 - 1908	Gerald B. Wadsworth
 1906 - 1907	Charles Capehart
 1896 - 1905	Data not available 

13 Presidents from the first 20 years of the organization include: M.M. Gillam, Artemas Ward, Herbert B Harding, Frank Presbrey, F. James Gibson (founder and first president), Samuel Brill, Phillip A Conne, W.R. Hotchkin, George B Van Cleve, Collin Armstrong, E.D. Gibbs, Henry C Brown and Preston P Lynn.

References

External links
 

Advertising organizations
Business organizations based in the United States
Clubs and societies in New York City
Organizations established in 1896
1896 establishments in New York City
Advertising in the United States